This is a list of documentary films about the Internment of Japanese Americans.

See also
Japanese American internment
List of feature films about the Japanese American internment

References

Japanese-American internment
 
Documentary films about racism in the United States
Japanese American internment